The year 1999 in archaeology involved some significant events.

Excavations
 Excavations resume at Qatna, in Syria, by the Deutsche Orient-Gesellschaft.
 Osiris Shaft in the Giza pyramid complex of Egypt, by Zahi Hawass.
 Wide-scope vertical and horizontal excavation of world's oldest wet-rice (rice paddy) agricultural feature, c. 800 BC, at Okhyeon site, Ulsan, Korea.
 Excavation at Tal-i Malyan in Anshan (Iran).
 Excavations at Hyde Abbey, Winchester, England.

Finds
 March 16 – Mummified Children of Llullaillaco found on the volcanic peak of Llullaillaco in South America.
 May 24–28 – Wreck of Israeli submarine INS Dakar (sunk 1968) located in eastern Mediterranean Sea.
 July 22 – A frozen and mummified body, later named Kwäday Dän Ts’ìnchi ("Long Ago Person Found"), is found in a Canadian glacier.
 Nebra sky disk found by illegal metal detectorists in Saxony-Anhalt; if its Bronze Age dating is accurate, it is the oldest physical depiction of the cosmos known from anywhere in the world.
 Shipwreck, originally thought to be , but later identified as Hamburg-America Line's Isis (sunk 1936), located in eastern Atlantic Ocean.
 Wreck of British submarine  (sunk 1925) in the English Channel.
 Shipwreck thought to be William Kidd's pirate ship Adventure Galley (scuttled 1698) located off Madagascar by Barry Clifford.
 Marausa wreck (Roman) located off Sicily.
 105 mummies are discovered in the first four tombs to be opened in the Valley of the Golden Mummies in Egypt.
 John and Deborah Darnell of the Theban Desert Road Survey announce discovery of inscriptions from around 1800 BCE at Wadi el-Hol, Egypt, in a partly phonetic Proto-Sinaitic alphabet.
 Venus of Tan-Tan (300,000–500,000 BP) found in Morocco.
 Ġebel ġol-Baħar, possibly a submerged megalithic temple, is discovered off the coast of Malta.
 Submerged ruins of Heracleion in Egypt are located and explored by French underwater archaeologist Franck Goddio after a 5-year search.
 Site of Must Farm Bronze Age settlement in The Fens of eastern England first located.
 Croatian Apoxyomenos raised from the sea.
 Discovery of Wezmeh Cave in Iran

Publications
 Penelope M. Allison (ed.) – The Archaeology of Household Activities.
 Victor Buchli – An Archaeology of Socialism.
 John Carman and Anthony Harding (ed.) – Ancient Warfare: archaeological perspectives.
 Chris Gosden and Jon Hather (ed.) – The Prehistory of Food: appetites for change.
 Matthew Johnson – Archaeological Theory: an introduction.
 Thomas Stöllner – Der prähistorische Salzbergbau am Dürrnberg bei Hallein: Forschungsgeschichte, Forschungsstand, Forschungsanliegen, Bd 1.
 July–August issue of Archaeology asks: "Is Schliemann Mask a Fake?". Some scholars, noting that the "Mask of Agamemnon" is significantly different from the others found at the site, contend that Schliemann had some of the features added to make the mask appear more heroic to viewers of his day.

Deaths
 March 31 – Yuri Knorozov, epigrapher of  Maya hieroglyphs (born 1922)
 May 30 – Sonia Chadwick Hawkes, early medieval archaeologist (born 1933)
 July 16 – Barri Jones (born 1936)
 Arvid Andrén (born 1902)

References

Archaeology by year
Archaeology